Markhus "Duke" Lacroix (born October 14, 1993) is an American professional soccer player who plays as a full-back for Colorado Springs Switchbacks in the USL Championship.

Career

Youth
Lacroix grew up in the New Egypt section of Plumsted Township, New Jersey. He attended the Lawrenceville School, where he played soccer and ran track. The native of New Egypt, N.J., attended The Lawrenceville School, where he played four years of soccer and ran three years of track his high school, his tenure as a runner including a 4x400 relay win at the prestigious Penn Relays. He was a member of the U.S. Under-14 and Under-15 Boys National Teams and was also a member of the U.S. Under-18 Men's National Team player pool following his time in New Jersey's Olympic Development Program.

He played four years of college soccer at the University of Pennsylvania between 2011 and 2014. While at the University of Pennsylvania, the two-time captain served as one of only three players in school history to receive four All-Ivy League honors (First-team honoree in 2013 & 2014, Second-team in 2012 and Honorable Mention in 2011).  He was also the only Quakers player ever to be named both the Ivy League's Rookie of the Year (2011) and an Ivy League Player of the Year (Offensive POY in 2013). Lacroix graduated with the third most appearances in Penn history with 68, during which he racked up the fifth most points with 65, coming from 25 goals and 15 assists – including seven goals and an Ivy League-best six assists as a senior in 2014. While in college, Lacroix also appeared for Premier Development League side Ocean City Nor'easters in 2012 and 2013.

Professional
Lacroix signed for North American Soccer League side Indy Eleven on May 21, 2015. He made his first appearance for the club in a 0–2 loss to Louisville City FC in the US Open Cup on May 27, 2015. His first goal for the club was the game-winning goal in a 3–0 victory over FC Edmonton on June 13, 2015. He would go on to play a total of 34 games and score three goals across two seasons with the Eleven, including the 2016 NASL Goal of the Year. The following season, Lacroix signed to the United Soccer League side Orange County Soccer Club on March 15, 2017. The following April, he signed for Reno 1868 FC in the United Soccer League. Lacroix played two seasons in Reno as a left back. He started 34 games in his second season, amassing 3,060 minutes played for the club. For the 2020 season, Lacroix signed to the United Soccer League side Charlotte Independence as a left back.

On December 8, 2020, Lacroix signed with Sacramento Republic FC.

Following the 2022 season, it was announced Lacroix would join USL Championship side Colorado Springs Switchbacks for the 2023 season.

References

External links
 Indy Eleven Profile.

1993 births
Living people
American soccer players
Penn Quakers men's soccer players
Ocean City Nor'easters players
Indy Eleven players
Orange County SC players
Reno 1868 FC players
Charlotte Independence players
Association football forwards
Soccer players from New Jersey
North American Soccer League players
USL League Two players
People from Plumsted Township, New Jersey
Sportspeople from Ocean County, New Jersey
Sacramento Republic FC players
Colorado Springs Switchbacks FC players